The following lists events that happened during 1960 in Chile.

Incumbents
President of Chile: Jorge Alessandri

Events

January
1 January – The Chilean escudo is placed in circulation.

February
18 February - Chile signs the Montevideo Treaty, which creates the Latin American Free Trade Association (ALALC).
21 February - The first version of the Viña del Mar International Song Festival.

April
3 April - Municipal elections are held.

May
22 May – occurs the 1960 Valdivia earthquake With a magnitude of 9.5 MW, it is the largest recorded in the history of mankind Its epicenter was the city of Valdivia and mainly affected the area between Talca and Chiloé Archipelago The earthquake was felt in different parts of the planet and produced both a tidal wave —which affected various locations throughout the Pacific Ocean such as Hawaii and Japan, such as the eruption of the Puyehue-Cordón Caulle, which covered the  Puyehue Lake with ashes Between 1,655 and 2,000 people died, and more than 2 million were affected by this disaster.

June
5 June - Diario Clarín reports that Valdivia is being evacuated due to the imminent overflow of Lake Riñihue.

September
18 September - The National Democratic Party was founded.

October
3-18 October - The 1960 Ibero-American Games are held in the city of Santiago.

November
4 November - The Television Corporation of the University of Chile, Channel 9, begins its transmissions from the city of Santiago
29 November - The National Institute of Statistics (INE) carries out the XIII National Population Census and the II Housing Census.

Births
2 February – Daniel Ahumada
16 February – Alfredo Nuñez (d. 2008)
3 July – Jorge Contreras
5 July – Hugo Rubio
2 August – Paulina Nin de Cardona
30 August – Andrés Velasco
30 November – Pamela Jiles
17 December – Pedro Rebolledo

Deaths
28 April – Carlos Ibáñez del Campo (b. 1877)

References 

 
Years of the 20th century in Chile
Chile
1960s in Chile
Chile